Himera may refer to:

Himera, an ancient Greek city of Sicily
Battle of Himera (480 BC), the 480 BC battle at the site 
Battle of Himera (409 BC), the 409 BC (Second) battle at the site 
Battle of the Himera River (311 BC), the 311 BC battle at the mouth of the river Salso
The ancient name of the river Imera Settentrionale Sicily
The ancient name of the river Salso of Sicily
Himera (album), an album by Aria

See also
Humera (disambiguation)